Adilya Tlekenova (born 17 July 2002) is a Kazakhstani rhythmic gymnast. She won the gold medal in the team event at the 2018 Asian Games held in Jakarta, Indonesia.

References

External links 
 

Living people
2002 births
Place of birth missing (living people)
Kazakhstani rhythmic gymnasts
Gymnasts at the 2018 Asian Games
Medalists at the 2018 Asian Games
Asian Games gold medalists for Kazakhstan
Asian Games medalists in gymnastics